Mathias W. Krigbaum (born 3 February 1995) is a Danish entrepreneur and former professional cyclist, who rode professionally between 2014 and 2019. He is the owner of Danish clothing brand L'evasion, and also works as a directeur sportif for UCI Continental team .

Major results

2011
 1st Time trial, European Youth Summer Olympic Festival
2012
 1st  Time trial, UEC European Junior Road Championships
 UEC European Junior Track Championships
1st  Team pursuit (with Mathias Møller Nielsen, Elias Busk and Jonas Poulsen)
2nd Madison (with Jonas Poulsen)
 National Track Championships
1st  Omnium
1st  Junior omnium
1st  Junior points race
1st  Junior team pursuit (with Jonas Poulsen, Patrick Olesen and Nicklas Pedersen Bøje)
 1st Stage 2b Tour du Pays de Vaud
 2nd Overall Niedersachsen-Rundfahrt
1st Stage 2
 5th Time trial, UCI Junior World Road Championships
2013
 1st  Madison, UCI Juniors Track World Championships (with Jonas Poulsen)
 1st  Overall Sint-Martinusprijs Kontich
1st Prologue & Stage 2
 2nd  Time trial, UCI Junior World Road Championships
 3rd Time trial, National Junior Road Championships
 9th Time trial, UEC European Junior Road Championships
2017
 National Road Championships
4th Road race
5th Time trial
 7th Overall Ronde van Midden Nederland

References

External links

1995 births
Living people
Danish male cyclists
Cyclists from Copenhagen
Businesspeople from Copenhagen